Little Pictures is a solo EP recorded between 1993 and 1994 by John K. Samson, then of Propagandhi. It was released in 1995 as a split album with Painted Thin's Small Acts of Love and Rebellion. It was one of G7 Welcoming Committee's first releases, in a PET film pouch. Samson later left Propagandhi and formed The Weakerthans. All six songs also appeared on his solo demo tape Slips and Tangles.

In 2006, both Little Pictures and Small Acts of Love and Rebellion were rereleased separately by G7 in mp3 format on their website and the iTunes Music Store.

Track listing

Maryland Bridge (4:24)
Sunday Afternoon (2:49)
Sympathetic Smile (3:28)
Farewell Faded Memory (4:42)
Saint Cecilia (2:50)
Little Pictures (4:24)

External links
G7's John K. Samson Page and MP3s

1995 EPs
2006 EPs
Split EPs
John K. Samson albums
G7 Welcoming Committee Records albums